Admiral Charles Henry Adair (2 July 1851 – 9 March 1920) was a Royal Navy officer in mid-late 19th century and the early 20th century.  He retired just prior to the outbreak of World War I.

Royal Navy service
Adair entered the Royal Navy, and saw early service in Eastern Sudan. He was briefly in command of the armoured cruiser HMS Australia from November 1899 to January 1900, when she was coast guard ship for Southampton Water. On 20 January 1900 he commissioned  for service on the Mediterranean Squadron. He was captain when on 9 November 1901 one of the ship's 6-inch (152 mm) guns exploded, killing one officer and five marines, and injuring another 20 people.

Charles Henry Adair died on 9 March 1920.

References

External links
Royal Navy Flag Officers 1904–1945 – Admiral Charles Henry Adair
The Dreadnought Project – Charles Henry Adair
thePeerage.com – Admiral Charles Henry Adair

1851 births
1920 deaths
Royal Navy admirals
Royal Navy personnel of the Mahdist War